My Life and Loves is the autobiography of the Ireland-born, naturalized-American writer and editor Frank Harris (1856–1931). As published privately by Harris between 1922 and 1927, and by Jack Kahane's Obelisk Press in 1931, the work consisted of four volumes, illustrated with many drawings and photographs of nude women. The book gives a graphic account of Harris's sexual adventures and relates gossip about the sexual activities of celebrities of his day.

The work was banned in both the United States and Britain for 40 years. It first became available in America in 1963. At one time it was sold in Paris for more than $100.

Contemporary and historic figures discussed frequently in the book include Robert Browning, Elizabeth Barrett Browning, Thomas Carlyle, Joseph Chamberlain, Lord Randolph Churchill, Sir Charles Wentworth Dilke, Lord Folkestone, William Ewart Gladstone, Heinrich Heine, George Meredith, Charles Stewart Parnell, Cecil Rhodes, Lord Salisbury, Byron Caldwell Smith, Algernon Charles Swinburne, Oscar Wilde, and many others.

Table of contents, volume 1

Foreword
The foreword begins, "Here in the blazing heat of an American August, amid the hurry and scurry of New York, I sit down to write my final declaration of Faith, as a preface or foreword to the Story of my Life."

Chapters
Chapter I.
Chapter II. LIFE IN AN ENGLISH GRAMMAR SCHOOL.
Chapter III. SCHOOL DAYS IN ENGLAND.
Chapter IV. FROM SCHOOL TO AMERICA.
Chapter V. THE GREAT NEW WORLD!
Chapter VI. LIFE IN CHICAGO!
Chapter VII. THE GREAT FIRE OF CHICAGO.
Chapter VIII. ON THE TRAIL!
Chapters IX. STUDENT LIFE AND LOVE.
Chapter X. SOME STUDY, MORE LOVE.
Chapter XI. MY FIRST VENUS.
Chapter XII. HARD TIMES AND NEW LOVES.
Chapter XIII. NEW EXPERIENCES.
Chapter XIV. WORK AND SOPHY.
Chapter XV. EUROPE AND THE CARLYLES.

Additional volume
In the early 1950s, Harris's widow Nellie sold about a hundred pages of his writings on further autobiographical matters to Kahane's son Maurice Girodias for a million French francs. Girodias gave the task of producing something publishable from them to Alexander Trocchi, and described the result as having only 20% of its content derived from the nominal source material. It was published by Girodias's Olympia Press in 1954 as My Life and Loves: Fifth Volume.

Grove Press omnibus edition

John F. Gallagher edited, and provided annotations for, a new omnibus edition, My Life and Loves: Five Volumes in One/Complete and Unexpurgated, published by Grove Press in 1963. This edition contained no illustrations. Gallagher described the Trocchi version as "apparently not authentic". James Campbell, comparing the two editions' fifth volumes, does however argue that Girodias's 20% figure was too low.

References

External links 
 My Life and Loves, Vol. 1, Vol. 2, Vol. 3,  Vol. 4 (The Jack Horntip Collection)
 My Life and Loves, Archive.org, "Privately printed 1922, address the author, I Rue du Helder: Paris"

Literary autobiographies
Erotic literature
1922 non-fiction books
1954 non-fiction books
1963 non-fiction books
American memoirs
Self-published books
Obelisk Press books